The 2017 PGA Tour Canada, titled as the 2017 Mackenzie Tour – PGA Tour Canada for sponsorship reasons, ran from June 1 to September 17 and consisted of 12 official golf tournaments. This was the 48th season of PGA Tour Canada (previously known as the Canadian Professional Golf Tour), and the fifth under the "PGA Tour Canada" name. It was also the third under the "Mackenzie Tour – PGA Tour Canada" name after Mackenzie Investments signed a six-year sponsorship deal.

The purse for most events was $175,000 with first place earning $31,500. The final event of the season, the Freedom 55 Financial Championship, had a purse of $200,000, with $36,000 going to the winner.

Schedule
The following table lists official events during the 2017 season.

Unofficial events
The following events were sanctioned by the PGA Tour Canada, but did not carry official money, nor were wins official.

Order of Merit
The Order of Merit was based on prize money won during the season, calculated in Canadian dollars. The top five players on the tour earned status to play on the 2018 Web.com Tour.

Notes

References

External links
PGA Tour Canada official site

PGA Tour Canada
PGA Tour Canada